Marcus Andrew Wiedower (born October 8, 1975) is an American businessman, real estate Agent and politician from Georgia. Wiedower is a Republican member of Georgia House of Representatives for District 119.

Early life 
In 1976, Wiedower was born in Atlanta, Georgia.

Education 
In 1999, Wiedower earned a bachelor's degree in Landscape Architecture from University of Georgia.

Career 
Wiedower is a former President of companies in the construction industry. Wiedower is a former owner of Blueprint Builders, a building contractor in Georgia. Wiedower is a real estate agent with Coldwell Banker Upchurch Realty in Georgia.

In 2016, Wiedower campaigned for a seat as County Commissioner of Oconee County, Georgia. Wiedower was defeated by Chuck Horton.

On November 6, 2018, Wiedower won the election and became a Republican member of Georgia House of Representatives for District 119. Wiedower defeated Jonathan Wallace with 52.78% of the votes. On November 3, 2020, as an incumbent, Wiedower won the election and continued serving District 119. Wiedower defeated Jonathan Wallace with 54.85% of the votes.

Personal life 
Wiedower's wife is Kelly Wiedower. They have three children. Wiedower and his family live in Watkinsville, Georgia.

In July 2020, Wiedower was diagnosed with COVID-19 and pneumonia and he has recovered.

References

External links 
 Marcus Wiedower at ballotpedia.org
 votemarcuswiedower.com
 U.S. TERM LIMITS PRAISES MARCUS WIEDOWER FOR SIGNING ITS PLEDGE (July 24, 2018)

21st-century American politicians
Living people
Republican Party members of the Georgia House of Representatives
People from Watkinsville, Georgia
1976 births